The São Nicolau Super Cup is a regional super cup competition played during the season in São Nicolau Island, Cape Verde. The super cup competition is organized by the São Nicolau Regional Football Association (Associação Regional de São Nicolau de Futebol, ARSNF).  Its current champions is Ultramarina Tarrafal  which now possess the most titles numbering six.

The regional champion competes with the cup champion. If a champion also has a cup title, a cup club who is runner-up qualifies.

The 2018 Super Cup will feature the champion Belo Horizonte from Juncalinho and the cup winner Ultramarina Tarrafal.

History
The first edition took place on November 5, 2006. For several editions, it featured two legs, some of them if a match ended a draw, a second leg was held, it was the only regional super cup in the country that had two legs.  Recently again only a single match takes place.

Tarrafal de São Nicolau, at the time, a year after the former municipality once consisted the whole island split in two started to possess a super cup title won by any clubs and was the only one, Tarrafal. Since 2007, Tarrafal de São Nicolau has the most titles won in the region, also since that time, Ultramarina has the most super cup titles won in the region., Ribeira Brava Municipality became second since 2008. In 2010, Ribeira Brava became the only municipality to have more than a club who have won a super cup title. in 2013, Ultramarina's three straight wins put the municipality solely having the most titles. In 2015, Belo Horizonte became the recent club to have a super cup title.

In 2016, the titles won by clubs in the eastern municipality of Ribeira Brava was tied with titles won by clubs in the western municipality of Tarrafal. In 2017, Ultramarina's win put Tarrafal de São Nicolau's title wins, one more than the eastern municipality, for Tarrafal, only one club has titles and is Ultramarina. Until December 23, 2017, never a club qualified as a cup runner up, Ultramarina Tarrafal became the only club to qualify both as champion and cup winner, Ribeira Brava qualified as runner up in the cup competitions. It was the last regional super cup competitions in Cape Verde where it never featured a club that was runner up in the cup competitions.  Ultramarina Tarrafal beat Ribeira Brava 8-0 and made it the highest result in the regional super cup history and is one of the highest of any in the nation.

Winners

1 Runner up in the cup competition as the regional champion was also a cup winner

Performance By Club

Performance by Municipality

See also
São Nicolau Cup
São Nicolau Island Championships
São Nicolau Opening Tournament

Notes

References

Sport in São Nicolau, Cape Verde
Football cup competitions in Cape Verde
2006 establishments in Cape Verde